Karam Singh is a town in the Islamabad Capital Territory of Pakistan. It is located at 33° 28' 50N 73° 24' 15E with an altitude of 605 metres (1988 feet).

References 

Union councils of Islamabad Capital Territory